Hangar 18 may refer to:

 Hangar 18, a hangar at the Wright-Patterson Air Force Base in Ohio purported to contain UFO (Unidentified Flying Object) technology
 Hangar 18 (band), an American hip hop group
 Hangar 18 (film), a 1980 science fiction film
 "Hangar 18" (song), a song by Megadeth from Rust in Peace
 "Hangar 18, Area 51", a song by Yngwie Malmsteen from the 1999 album Alchemy
 Hangar 18, an Alienware HD media server
 Hangar 18, a DLC map for Call of Duty: Black Ops

See also

 
 Hangar (disambiguation)
 18 (disambiguation)
 Area 51 (disambiguation)